Lysovice is a municipality and village in Vyškov District in the South Moravian Region of the Czech Republic. It has about 300 inhabitants.

History
The first written mention of Lysovice is from 1465. Lysovice was referred to as property of Dominican convent in Olomouc in 1519 and probably was its property since foundation of the village. In 1685, the convent sold the village to Count Dominik Ondřej of Kaunitz who joined to his Slavkov estate.

Until 1945, Lysovice belonged to the German-speaking enclave called Vyškov Language Island. The coexistence of Czechs and Germans was mostly peaceful, which changed only after 1935, when many Germans tended to Nazism. In 1945, the German population was expelled and the municipality was resettled by Czech and Volhynian Czech families.

References

Villages in Vyškov District